The prime minister of Zimbabwe was a political office in the government of Zimbabwe that existed on two occasions. The first person to hold the position was Robert Mugabe from 1980 to 1987 following independence from the United Kingdom. He took office when Southern Rhodesia became the Republic of Zimbabwe on 18 April 1980. This position was abolished when the constitution was amended in 1987 and Mugabe became president of Zimbabwe, replacing Canaan Banana as the head of state while also remaining the head of government. The office of prime minister was restored in 2009 and held by Morgan Tsvangirai until the position was again abolished by the 2013 Constitution of Zimbabwe.

History of the office

Original office

Zimbabwe's prime ministerial office owes its origins to the country's predecessor states. The position began with George Mitchell who became prime minister of Southern Rhodesia in 1933. All subsequent predecessor-states continued with the post until Abel Muzorewa who became prime minister of Zimbabwe Rhodesia in 1979 under the Internal Settlement. The Lancaster House Agreement brought an independence constitution which made provision for a parliamentary system, with a president as head of state and a prime minister as head of government. The presidency was mostly ceremonial; real power was vested with the prime minister.

The 1980 election resulted in a ZANU–PF victory with Robert Mugabe becoming prime minister and Canaan Banana president. Mugabe and Banana were returned to office in the 1985 election.

However, in 1987 the government revised the constitution and made the presidency an executive post. The prime minister's post was abolished, and its functions were effectively merged with those of the president. Mugabe ascended to the presidency.

Restored office

The restoration of the office of prime minister in 2009 was a result of a power-sharing agreement made in September 2008 between Mugabe's ZANU–PF and rival candidate Morgan Tsvangirai's MDC–T after the 2008 presidential election and later run-off. Mugabe remained president while Tsvangirai was sworn into the office of prime minister on 11 February 2009. Executive authority was shared between the president, the prime minister and the cabinet, with ZANU–PF and the MDC–T sharing portfolio ministries. It was the prime minister's role to chair the council of ministers and act as the deputy chairperson of Cabinet and also oversee the formulation of government policies by the Cabinet. In addition, the prime minister was a member of the National Security Council, chaired by the president and sat alongside the heads of the armed forces, intelligence, prison services and police. According to section 20.1.8 of the 1980 Constitution of Zimbabwe (No. 19) Amendment, the prime minister, vice-presidents and deputy prime ministers became ex officio members of the House of Assembly without needing to represent parliamentary constituencies, and the party of a constituency-based MP who concurrently served in any of the above offices held the right to nominate non-constituency members to such offices. The post of prime minister did not hold the full executive powers it held during the 1980s and the president remained head of the cabinet. In 2012 Tsvangirai claimed that the power-sharing agreement was not being honoured and that he was not being consulted by the president over some appointments. The government held a referendum in March 2013 to approve a new constitution. As a result, the post of prime minister was abolished from 11 September 2013. Tsvangirai and Mugabe both contested the general election in July 2013 for the single post of president. Mugabe was elected.

Prime ministers of Zimbabwe (1980–1987; 2009–2013)

|- style="text-align:center;"
| colspan=9| Post abolished (31 December 1987 – 11 February 2009)

|- style="text-align:center;"
| colspan=9| Post abolished (11 September 2013 – present)

Rank by time in office

See also
President of Zimbabwe
Deputy Prime Minister of Zimbabwe
Prime Minister of Rhodesia
Prime Minister of Zimbabwe Rhodesia

Notes

References

External links
Zimbabwe Prime Minister Online

Zimbabwe, Prime Minister of
Prime Minister
Prime Ministers
1980 establishments in Zimbabwe
1987 disestablishments in Zimbabwe
2009 establishments in Zimbabwe
2013 disestablishments in Zimbabwe